Yuliya Alekseyevna Golubchikova (born 27 March 1983 in Moscow, Soviet Union) is a Russian pole vaulter.

Golubchikova's personal best jump is 4.75 metres, achieved at the 2008 Olympic Games in Beijing where she ended on a fourth place (she cleared the same height as eventual bronze medalist Svetlana Feofanova, but Golubchikova needed more attempts). She has 4.75 metres indoor.

International competitions

References

 
 Profile at the 2008 Olympic Games official website
 EAA profile

1983 births
Living people
Russian female pole vaulters
Olympic athletes of Russia
Athletes (track and field) at the 2008 Summer Olympics
Competitors at the 2005 Summer Universiade
World Athletics Championships athletes for Russia
European Athletics Indoor Championships winners
Russian Athletics Championships winners